Monte Alegre, Pará is a municipality in the state of Pará in the Northern region of Brazil. It is located along the Amazon River in northern Brazil.

Near this area along the Amazon River is the Caverna da Pedra Pintada, an ancient archeological site with numerous rock paintings and pictographs. Excavations at the cave have found evidence of ancient peoples.

Nature 
The north of the municipality contains a small part (3.44%) of the  Grão-Pará Ecological Station, the largest fully protected tropical forest conservation unit on the planet.
It also includes a small part (5.51%) of the  Maicuru Biological Reserve.
The municipality contains roughly half of the  Mulata National Forest, a sustainable use conservation unit created in 2001.
It contains all of the fully protected  Monte Alegre State Park, created in 2001.

Transportation
The city is served by Monte Alegre Airport.

Climate 
The climate is tropical savanna (Köppen: Aw) with dry season defined.

See also
List of municipalities in Pará

References

Municipalities in Pará
Populated places on the Amazon